The PRC Subdivision is a railway line owned and operated by the Rapid City, Pierre and Eastern Railroad (RCPE), a subsidiary of Genesee & Wyoming. The line is the company's important east–west route, connecting Rapid City to Pierre, both in South Dakota. It uses the Chicago and North Western Railroad Bridge to cross the Missouri River between Pierre and Fort Pierre.

The route is not equipped with centralized traffic control or automatic block signalling systems. Traffic is controlled via radio under track warrant control rules.

In addition to freight yards located at Pierre and Rapid City, there are passing sidings at Philip and Wall. There is also a wye at Wall. At other locations only spur tracks exist. Station at Cottonwood does not have a siding or spur tracks.

Connections
The PRC Subdivision connects with Pierre Subdivision at Pierre and with Black Hills Subdivision at Rapid City. There was also a spur track connection to Ellsworth Air Force Base at Box Elder. This connection is not active as it was closed off in 2004 by the U.S. Air Force.

There are no connections to other rail traffic operators along this line.

External links
 Dakota, Minnesota and Eastern Railfan Timetables: PRC Subdivision

Dakota, Minnesota and Eastern Railroad
Chicago and North Western Railway
Rapid City, Pierre and Eastern Railroad
Rail infrastructure in South Dakota